{{Automatic taxobox
| fossil_range = Late Oligocene (Deseadan)-Early Holocene (Lujanian)~
| image = Eremotherium.jpg
| image_caption = Eremotherium skeleton, NMNH, Washington, DC.
| taxon = Megatheriidae
| authority = J. E. Gray 1821
| type_genus = †Megatherium americanum
| subdivision_ranks = Subgroups
| subdivision = * †Thalassocnus?
†Planopsinae
 †Planops
 †Prepoplanops
 †Prepotherium
 †Proprepotherium
†Megatheriinae
}}

Megatheriidae is a family of extinct ground sloths that lived from approximately 23 mya—11,000 years ago.

Megatheriids appeared during the Late Oligocene (Deseadan in the SALMA classification), some 29 million years ago, in South America. The group includes the heavily built Megatherium (given its name 'great beast' by Georges Cuvier) and Eremotherium. The nothrotheres have recently been placed in their own family, Nothrotheriidae.

The skeletal structure of these ground sloths indicates that the animals were massive. Their thick bones and even thicker joints (especially those on the hind legs) gave their appendages tremendous power that, combined with their size and fearsome claws, provided a formidable defense against predators.

The earliest megatheriid in North America was Sibotherium which arrived 5.3 million years ago, after crossing the recently formed Panamanian land bridge. Unlike relatives, this species retained a plesiomorphic extra claw. While other species of Eremotherium had four fingers with only two or three claws, E. eomigrans had five fingers, four of them with claws up to nearly a foot long.

 Phylogeny 
The following sloth family phylogenetic tree is based on collagen and mitochondrial DNA sequence data (see Fig. 4 of Presslee et al., 2019).

The following phylogeny is based on Varela et al''. 2019.

References

External links 

 CTD: Megatheriidae
 Memidex: Megatheriidae

 
Prehistoric mammal families
 
 
 
Burdigalian first appearances
Holocene extinctions
Neogene mammals of South America
Neogene mammals of North America
Pleistocene mammals of South America
Pleistocene mammals of North America
Taxa named by John Edward Gray